The Fiel contraste is a sculptural group created by the Spanish sculptor Ramón Conde, located in Pontevedra, Spain. It stands in Alhóndiga street, behind the Pontevedra City Hall, and was inaugurated on 30 April 2010.

History 
The sculptural group is located in the place where the Alhóndiga or municipal grain market was in the Middle Ages. The central statue recalls the medieval Civil Servant (hired by the town hall) who, at the entrance to the walls of Pontevedra, near the Bastida Tower, faithfully contrasted with his scales the weights and measures of the goods that were to be sold in the city.

Until the 16th century, the Alhóndiga was located where the Pontevedra City Hall is today. At the entrance to the Alhóndiga, the Fiel Contraste was responsible for checking the weights and measures of all the goods that arrived there to be sold. The taxes on the market depended on the verification of the weight of bread or cereals or the measures of wine. The disappearance of this profession occurred with the unification of weights and measures brought about by the Bourbon administration, with the appearance of the metric system and, finally, with the inauguration of the current City Hall in 1880.

The commercial and fishing boom in Pontevedra had boosted the holding of markets in the city, notably the Feira Franca granted to Pontevedra in 1467 by King Henry IV of Castile, when the city was the main port in Galicia.

Description 
The sculptural group consists of five pieces. His strong features denote power and authority in the exercise of his function to resolve conflicts about the exact weight of products in the city's fairs and markets.

Around this central statue are four two-dimensional pieces of Corten Steel in the form of silhouettes or shadows depicting popular characters from a medieval city market, such as shopkeepers with their baskets in front of them or merchants on any given day in a city market.

The sculptural group is valued at 100,000 euros.

Gallery

References

See also

Related articles 
 Pontevedra City Hall

External links 
 https://www.outono.net/elentir/2016/01/26/el-fiel-contraste-un-monumento-al-almotacen-de-pontevedra/
 http://esculturayarte.com/022739/Fiel-Contraste-1-en-Pontevedra.html#.X8aQe86g82w

Pontevedra
Colossal statues
Bronze sculptures in Spain
Outdoor sculptures in Spain
Sculptures in Spain
21st-century sculptures
Sculptures of men in Spain
Tourist attractions in Galicia (Spain)
Monuments and memorials in Pontevedra
Monuments and memorials in Galicia (Spain)
Sculptures in Pontevedra
History of Pontevedra